Hexie, also known as the CRH series EMU, is an umbrella term for the multiple unit high-speed and higher-speed trains operated by China Railway under the China Railway High-speed brand. All series of Hexie are based on foreign-developed technology and later manufactured locally in China through technology transfer licenses, with the ultimate goal of China acquiring the know-how and capability to produce high-speed rail trains.

The Harmony series does not belong to any single platform, instead encompassing all high-speed trains in China with roots in foreign technology, specifically CRH1, CRH2, CRH3 and CRH5. Although later variants of Hexie such as CRH380A were designed by Chinese companies, they are still classified as CRH due to incorporation of foreign technology.

History
In 2007, China's Ministry of Railways drafted a plan for China's future high-speed network. Bombardier Transportation, Kawasaki Heavy Industries, Alstom and later Siemens joined the high-speed train manufacturing project that later became known as Harmony. Forming joint-ventures with Chinese company CNR and CSR, these four foreign companies signed agreements with China to manufacture high-speed trains for China as well as provide assistance for Chinese companies to manufacture train cars locally in the future.

While the initial train sets from each Hexie series were manufactured overseas, subsequent sets are manufactured locally through technology transfer, a key requirement for China. The signalling, track and support structures, control software, and station design are developed domestically with foreign elements as well. Although the first domestically produced trains were initially delivered in complete knock-down form, eventually manufacturing as a whole became predominantly Chinese.

China currently holds many patents related to the internal components of these trains, re-designed in China to allow the trains to run at higher speeds than the foreign designs allowed. However, these patents are only valid within China, and as such hold no international power. This weakness on the intellectual property of Hexie trains became an obstruction for China to export its high-speed rail related products, leading to the development of a completely redesigned train brand, Fuxing, which is based on indigenous technologies.

While most Hexie series trains are designed for China Railway, a variant of the CRH380A has been modified for operation by MTR Corporation of Hong Kong, who will operate these trains under the brand Vibrant Express specifically for the Guangzhou–Shenzhen–Hong Kong Express Rail Link.

Variants

The Harmony brand has different electric multiple unit trainsets, the designs for which are imported from other nations and designated CRH-1 through CRH-5 and CRH380A(L), CRH380B(L), and CRH380C(L). CRH trainsets are intended to provide fast and convenient travel between cities. Some of the trainsets are manufactured locally through technology transfer, a key requirement for China. The signalling, track and support structures, control software, and station design are developed domestically with foreign elements as well, so the system as a whole is predominantly Chinese. China currently holds many new patents related to the internal components of these trains, re-designed in China to allow the trains to run at higher speeds than the foreign designs allowed. However, these patents are only valid within China, and as such hold no international power.

The trainsets are as follows:
 CRH1 produced by Bombardier Transportation's joint venture Sifang Power (Qingdao) Transportation (BST), CRH1A, and CRH1B, nicknamed "Metro" or "Bread", derived from Bombardier's Regina; CRH1E, nicknamed "Lizard", is Bombardier's ZEFIRO 250 design.
 CRH1A: sets consists of 8 cars; maximum operating speed of 
 CRH1B: a modified 16-car version; maximum operating speed of 
 CRH1E: a 16-car high-speed sleeper version; maximum operating speed of 
 CRH2: nicknamed "Hairtail", derived from E2 Series 1000 Shinkansen.
 CRH2A: In 2006, China unveiled CRH2, a modified version of the Japanese Shinkansen E2-1000 series. An order for 60 8-car sets had been placed in 2004, with the first few built in Japan, the rest produced by Sifang Locomotive and Rolling Stock in China.
 CRH2B: a modified 16-car version of CRH2; maximum operating speed of 
 CRH2E: a modified 16-car version of CRH2 with sleeping cars
 CRH6: designed by CSR Puzhen and CSR Sifang, will be manufactured by CSR Jiangmen.
Developed by CSR and manufactured by Sifang Locomotive and Rolling Stock; entered service in 2010.
 CRH380A: 8-car version
 CRH380AL: 16-car version
 CRH380B: 8-car version
 CRH380BL: 16-car version
 CRH380CL: designed and manufactured by CRRC Changchun Railway Vehicles. Maximum operating speed of 380 km/h; planned to enter service in 2012.
 CRH380D: 8-car version

However, in practical terms, issues such as maintenance costs, comfort, and safety make the maximum speed of more than  impractical and remain limiting factors.

Chinese CRH trainsets order timetable

Chinese CRH trainsets delivery timetable
Based on data published by Sinolink Securities; some small changes were made according to the most recent news.

  All CRH380B and CRH380C units to be delivered before 2012.
  All CRH380D units to be delivered before 2014.

Gallery

See also
 China Railway High-speed, Chinese high-speed railway service
 China Railway, Chinese state-owned corporation that operates nearly all Harmony trains.
 Fuxing (train), next-generation EMU developed by China with independent intellectual property rights.

References 

High-speed trains of China
Electric multiple units of China
Passenger trains running at least at 350 km/h in commercial operations
Passenger trains running at least at 200 km/h in commercial operations
CRRC multiple units
25 kV AC multiple units